

Portugal
Angola – Nicolau Aberu Castelo Branco, Governor of Angola (1823–1829)

Spanish Empire

Captaincy General of Cuba – Francisco Dionisio Vives, Governor of Cuba (1823–1832)
Captaincy General of Puerto Rico – Miguel de la Torre y Pando, conde de Torrepando, Governor of Puerto Rico (1822–1837)
Spanish East Indies – Juan Antonio Martínez, Governor-General of the Philippines (1822–1825) 
Viceroyalty of Peru – 
José de la Serna e Hinojosa, 1st Count of los Andes (1821–1824)
Juan Pío de Tristán y Moscoso, nominal Viceroy of Peru (1824–1826)

United Kingdom
 Malta Colony
Thomas Maitland, Governor of Malta (1813–1824)
Francis Rawdon-Hastings, Governor of Malta (1824–1826)
New South Wales – Major-General Thomas Brisbane, Governor of New South Wales (1821–1825)

Colonial governors
Colonial governors
1824